Delta Sigma Theta  is an international pharmacy fraternity founded in the fall of 1914. It was created to promote the healing arts of pharmacy, medicine and dentistry.

History
In the fall of 1914, Delta Sigma Theta was established at Brooklyn College of Pharmacy as an outgrowth of the Mortar and Pestle club (local). There were six founders lead by A. Bertram Lemon. The organization was started on December 11, 1915, and one year later was incorporated in New York State as Alpha chapter of Delta Sigma Theta.

The fraternity then expanded within New York and across New England. It also expanded to include other healthcare professions, including medicine and dentistry. Some notable chapters founded during this era include Rutgers' Epsilon chapter and Columbia's Delta chapter. 

By the late 1920s, Delta Sigma Theta became an international fraternity by establishing chapters in Beirut, Rome, and Great Britain. The growing fraternity paused in its growth like other such societies when the start of World War II led to a decrease in fraternity enrollment nationwide. However, once the war concluded, Delta Sigma Theta expanded westward; the Chi chapter was founded in May 1963 by a Mu chapter alumni, Alfonso Tobias. 

As of 2021, the Chi chapter has had over 430 brothers initiated within its chapter.

Chapters
Chapter list from Baird's 20th edition. Active chapters are indicated in bold. Inactive chapters are indicated in italic.

Notes

See also
 Professional fraternities and sororities
 Rho Chi, co-ed, pharmacy honor society

References

1914 establishments in New York City
Student organizations established in 1914
Professional pharmaceutical fraternities and sororities in the United States